Youdiou (Yú:jú) is a village and commune and seat of the Cercle of Koro in the Mopti Region of Mali. In 1998 the commune had a population of 15,737.

Jamsay Dogon is spoken in the village. Local surnames are Poudiougo, Douyon, and Saye. There is a weekly Thursday market in the village. Youdiou also has a Protestant church.

Some typical cultivated plants are millet, sorghum, corn, rice and sesame.

References

Communes of Mopti Region